Detlef Hugo Otto Uhlemann (born 24 September 1949) is a German former long-distance runner who competed for West Germany. Born in the Altenessen district of the city of Essen, he represented his country at the 1976 Summer Olympics, being a finalist in the 5000 metres. He was a member of the LG Bonn/Troisdorf athletics club during his career.

The greatest success of his international career came in cross country running. He was a six-time participant at the IAAF World Cross Country Championships and was a bronze medallist at the 1977 edition (held in his native West Germany) – he was the first German to reach the podium and alongside 1980 medallist Hans-Jürgen Orthmann remains one of only two German senior medallists at the competition. He also ranked in the top five at the 1974 and 1976 editions. A global title came when he won the 1974 World Military Cross Country Championships. He was the world military runner-up in 1975.

Uhlemann also represented West Germany on the track, competing at two European Athletics Championships, and represented Europe at the 1977 IAAF World Cup. He was twice a silver medallist in the 10,000 metres at the European Cup, taking the runner-up spot in 1973 and 1977. He was the 10,000 m champion at the 1976 CISM World Military Track and Field Championships. He was a four-time West German champion in the 10,000 m and also won two national titles in cross country.

On the professional circuit, he was the 1977 winner of the Lotto Cross Cup de Hannut, was runner-up at the 1975 Cursa Jean Bouin, and took second place at the 1976 San Silvestre Vallecana.

International competitions

National titles
West German Athletics Championships
10,000 metres: 1973, 1974, 1975, 1977
West German Cross Country Championships
Long course: 1974, 1975

References

External links

Living people
1949 births
Sportspeople from Essen
German male long-distance runners
West German male long-distance runners
Olympic athletes of West Germany
Athletes (track and field) at the 1976 Summer Olympics
West German male cross country runners
German male cross country runners
20th-century German people